Autochloris umbratus is a moth of the subfamily Arctiinae. It was described by Henry Fleming in 1950. It is found in Venezuela.

References

Arctiinae
Moths described in 1950
Moths of South America